The IEEE John von Neumann Medal was established by the IEEE Board of Directors in 1990 and may be presented annually "for outstanding  achievements in computer-related science and technology." The achievements may be theoretical, technological, or entrepreneurial, and need not have been made immediately prior to the date of the award.

The medal is named after John von Neumann.

Recipients 
The following people have received the IEEE John von Neumann Medal:

See also 

 List of computer science awards
 John von Neumann Theory Prize awarded by the Institute for Operations Research and the Management Sciences (INFORMS).
 Prizes named after people

References 

Computer science awards
John von Neumann Medal
Awards established in 1992